WBML (1350 AM) is a radio station licensed to Warner Robins, Georgia and serves the Macon, Georgia area. Broadcasting a classic hits format branded as "Fox FM", the station can also be heard on two FM translators in the Macon area, 94.7 W234CQ Macon which relays programming from WFXM-HD3, and 95.5 W238CG Warner Robins, which is licensed to relay WBML. WBML is owned by John Timms.

History
The station signed on October 13, 1954, as WRPB, signifying Warner Robins, Perry and Byron.  Other call letters included WAVC, WCOP and WNNG.

Prior to the current format, WRWR simulcasted WRWR-FM's news/talk format and had been WNNG, "Wing 1350", a satellite-fed adult standards station broadcasting ABC Radio's Timeless format (the station had used ABC's now-defunct "Unforgettable Favorites"/"Memories" network which was merged with "Timeless Classics" to create the current "Timeless Favorites", and before that, Westwood One's America's Best Music).

On February 19, 2015, WRWR changed its format from urban AC to black gospel, branded as "Praise 95.5" under new WYPZ calls. The station changed its call sign on October 5, 2015, to the current WBML.

In mid-2017, WBML started simulcasting programming from Classic Hits formatted "The Fox 94.7" WFXM-HD3/W234CQ Gordon/Macon. According to station management, station operator Christopher Murray, who owns WFXM, WRWR, and WYPZ in the Macon market (as well as WEKS, and WBAF in the Fayetteville market) has announced his plans to eventually acquire WBML from John Timms, who is currently the owner and engineer for WBML.

Eventually, WBML/WFXM-HD3/W234CQ would rebrand as "94.7 and 95.5 Fox FM" with no change in format.

As of 2020, the Classic Hits "Fox FM" brand can now be heard in the Fayetteville market on two separate AM stations (WBAF and WFDR) and their FM translators. While they aren't simulcasting WBML, the music playlist, logo, imaging and programming is almost identical to that of WBML. "Fox FM" programming was later expanded into Atlanta on WWPW-HD4/102.1 W271CV.

References

External links

BML
Radio stations established in 1956
1954 establishments in Georgia (U.S. state)